Charapa (also Romanized as Charāpā) is a village in Gharbi Rural District, in the Central District of Ardabil County, Ardabil Province, Iran. At the 2006 census, its population was 42, in 11 families.

References 

Towns and villages in Ardabil County